Diyral Briggs (born October 31, 1985) is a former American football linebacker. He was signed by the San Francisco 49ers as an undrafted free agent in 2009. He was part of the Green Bay Packers' Super Bowl XLV team that beat the Pittsburgh Steelers. He played college football at Bowling Green.

Professional career

San Francisco 49ers
Briggs was signed by the San Francisco 49ers as an undrafted free agent. He appeared in five games before being released in September.

Denver Broncos
He was later signed to the Denver Broncos' practice squad and was on the active roster for one game. He was cut by the Broncos on October 25, 2010 and was claimed off waivers by the Green Bay Packers a day later.

Green Bay Packers
At the end of the 2010 season, Briggs and the Packers appeared in Super Bowl XLV against the Pittsburgh Steelers. In the 31–25 win, he had one total tackle.

He was waived by Green Bay on August 15, 2011.

Virginia Destroyers
Briggs was signed by the Virginia Destroyers of the United Football League on August 29, 2011.

Kansas City Command
For the 2012 season, Briggs played for the Kansas City Command of the Arena Football League.  He would make 26 tackles, 13 assists, five sacks, two punt blocks, two forced fumbles, and two fumble recoveries that season.

Spokane Shock
In 2013, Briggs joined the Spokane Shock.

References

External links
 Green Bay Packers bio
 San Francisco 49ers bio
 Video interview from 2011 after winning Super Bowl XLV about his year while on a visit to Bowling Green

1985 births
Living people
People from Mount Healthy, Ohio
Players of American football from Ohio
American football linebackers
Bowling Green Falcons football players
San Francisco 49ers players
Sportspeople from the Cincinnati metropolitan area
Denver Broncos players
Green Bay Packers players
Virginia Destroyers players
Kansas City Command players
Kansas City Renegades players
Spokane Shock players